Praeacedes is a monotypic moth genus in the family Tineidae first described by Hans Georg Amsel in 1954. Its only species, Praeacedes atomosella, was first described by Francis Walker in 1863. It has a wide range and has been recorded from Europe (the Canary Islands, Cyprus and Malta), Australia, Hawaii, India, Malaysia, Solomon Islands, Easter Island, Mauritius, Madagascar, Réunion, South America and North America. The species has commonly been misidentified in various parts of the world.

The larvae appear to feed on insect detritus and potentially also on mites, and earlier records of them feeding on pigeon dung might be erroneous. The larvae create brown larval cases. Pupation takes place within this case which serves as its cocoon. When the moth issues the pupa is extruded.

References

External links
Fauna Europaea

Tineinae
Cosmopolitan moths
Fauna of the Gambia
Monotypic moth genera
Taxa named by Hans Georg Amsel